Joseph West Molyneaux (December 12, 1859 – January 24, 1940) was a United States district judge of the United States District Court for the District of Minnesota.

Education and career

Born in Bellevue, Kentucky, Molyneaux received a Bachelor of Laws from the University of Cincinnati College of Law in 1882. He was in private practice in Minneapolis, Minnesota from 1884 to 1913. He was a Judge of the Minneapolis District Court from 1913 to 1925.

Federal judicial service

On March 18, 1925, Molyneaux was nominated by President Calvin Coolidge to a new seat on the United States District Court for the District of Minnesota created by 43 Stat. 1098. He was confirmed by the United States Senate on March 18, 1925, and received his commission the same day. He assumed senior status on February 28, 1937. Molyneaux served in that capacity until his death on January 24, 1940, in Minneapolis.

References

Sources
 

1863 births
1940 deaths
Minnesota state court judges
Judges of the United States District Court for the District of Minnesota
United States district court judges appointed by Calvin Coolidge
20th-century American judges